Shiv Ram Singh Inter college is a private school situated in Barabanki, Uttar Pradesh, India.This College Was Founded in 2007 By Shiv Ram Singh.

References

External links 
Official website

Primary schools in Uttar Pradesh
High schools and secondary schools in Uttar Pradesh
Schools in Barabanki, Uttar Pradesh
Educational institutions established in 2007
2007 establishments in Uttar Pradesh